Ich bin Boes is a German television series. It aired on 27 February 2010 for the first time in German Television. Boes (colloquial for böse) is German for "evil".

Actors 
Mirja Boes is shown in every single sketch. There are some other actors too.

See also 
List of German television series

External links 
 

2010 German television series debuts
2013 German television series endings
German comedy television series
RTL (German TV channel) original programming
German-language television shows